Spyros Glynos (born 2 December 1997) is a Greek professional footballer who plays as a winger for Super League 2 club AEL.

References

1997 births
Living people
Super League Greece players
Super League Greece 2 players
Football League (Greece) players
Gamma Ethniki players
Panionios F.C. players
Kallithea F.C. players
Diagoras F.C. players
Athlitiki Enosi Larissa F.C. players
Association football wingers
Footballers from Athens
Greek footballers